Alan Coomey (born 25 June 1984) is a Gaelic footballer and Australian rules footballer

Playing career
Coomey played wingman for the Ireland national Australian rules football team, that won the 2001 Atlantic Alliance Cup and the 2002 Australian Football International Cup. He was one of Ireland's best on ground, kicking 3 goals in the final against Papua New Guinea. He returned with the team to help them reclaim the 2011 Australian Football International Cup title and kicked one goal in the tournament. He currently plays with East Fremantle Football Club. He previously played for Bishopstown GAA & Leeside Lions.

References

1984 births
Living people
Bishopstown Gaelic footballers
East Fremantle Football Club players
Gaelic footballers who switched code
Irish players of Australian rules football
Sportspeople from Cork (city)